Riley McGovern (born October 17, 1991) is an American soccer player.

Career

College and Amateur
McGovern spent his entire college career at the University of New Mexico, playing for his outstanding head coach Jeremy Fishbein. He lists Fishbein among those who have influenced him the most.  He made a total of 52 appearances for the Lobos and tallied five goals and five assists.

He also played for FC Tucson in the Premier Development League.

Professional
On February 26, 2015, McGovern signed a professional contract with USL expansion side Real Monarchs SLC.  He made his professional debut a month later in a 0–0 draw against LA Galaxy II.

References

External links
New Mexico Lobos bio

1991 births
Living people
American soccer players
New Mexico Lobos men's soccer players
FC Tucson players
Real Monarchs players
Association football defenders
Soccer players from Oklahoma
USL League Two players
USL Championship players